Nichirō (日朗, 1245–1320) was a Buddhist disciple of Nichiren, the nephew of Nisshō. 

Nichirō agreed with Nisshō's defense of Nichiren as a Tendai reformer. He founded a practice hall that became part of Ikegami Honmon-ji, the site of Nichiren's death. His school is now part of Nichiren-shū.

Nichirō designated nine senior disciples. Among them were Nichizō and Nichiin.

External links 
 The Six Major Disciples of Nichiren

1245 births
1320 deaths
Japanese Buddhist clergy
Nichiren-shū Buddhist monks
Nichiren Buddhism
Kamakura period Buddhist clergy